The list of ship commissionings in 1952 includes a chronological list of all ships commissioned in 1952.


See also 

1952
 Ship commissionings